"Amarantine" is a single by Irish musician Enya, taken from the album of the same name. The word is taken from ancient Greek and means everlasting or immortal (the same as the amaranth flower). The single was released in the United Kingdom on 5 December 2005.

Several versions of "Amarantine" were released, some containing all three tracks, and some omitting the "Spaghetti Western" track. In some areas, Reprise released both a "Part I" single containing "Amarantine" and "The Comb of the Winds" and a "Part II" single that contained all three tracks.

The "Spaghetti Western Theme" is an atypical Enya recording arranged in the style of Ennio Morricone's work on films such as A Fistful of Dollars and The Good, the Bad and the Ugly. A previously unreleased recording from The Celts soundtrack from 1986, Enya released it in memory of BBC producer Tony McAuley. Enya performed the song on Live! with Regis and Kelly and The Early Show.

Track listing

French CD single
 "Amarantine" (album version)
 "Boadicea" (single version)
 "Orinoco Flow"

Charts

References

External links
 

Enya songs
2005 singles
2005 songs
Music videos directed by Tim Royes
Reprise Records singles
Songs with lyrics by Roma Ryan
Songs with music by Enya